Montasio is a mountain cheese made from cow's milk produced in northeastern Italy in the regions of Friuli-Venezia Giulia and Veneto.

It was awarded a protected designation of origin (PDO) in 1986.

History 
It takes its name from the famous Montasio plateau, where cheese has been produced since 1200; the first production techniques were refined at the abbey of San Gallo di Moggio Udinese, while the first evidence of the name dates back to the decree of 22 August 1773, when the Council of the city of Udine imposed on traders the sale at a fixed price of some products, including this cheese, which, we learn from that document, the price of 19 soldi a pound was imposed.

Already in 1880, a cooperative movement of dairies was formed to support the production of this cheese. A decree of the Ministry of Agriculture and Forests of 16 March 1987, assigned the Montasio Producers Association the tasks of supervision, control and marketing of Montasio production.

Characteristics
 Made from cow's milk
 Country of origin: Italy
 Region: Friuli Venezia Giulia and Veneto
 Alternative spellings: Montasio Fresco
 Type: semi-hard. Versions aged longer develop a harder texture.
 Fat content: 32%
 Texture: creamy and open
 Rind: natural
 Color: pale yellow to gold, depending on age

Aging
It is typically aged for a minimum of two months, and some preparations are aged for a year or more. The rind is typically stamped with the date of its production.

See also
 Friulano
 Bergkäse
 Jôf di Montasio

References

External links
 Montasio official website
 Montasio
 

Cheeses of Veneto
Italian cheeses
Friuli-Venezia Giulia
Veneto
Italian products with protected designation of origin
Cheeses with designation of origin protected in the European Union